Lystad Bay is a bay  wide which indents the west side of Horseshoe Island, in the northeast part of Marguerite Bay, Antarctica. The name was proposed by the Advisory Committee on Antarctic Names for Captain Isak Lystad of the North Star.

References

Bays of Graham Land
Fallières Coast